Research Corporation for Science Advancement (RCSA) is an organization in the United States devoted to the advancement of science, funding research projects in the physical sciences. Since 1912, Research Corporation for Science Advancement has identified trends in science and education, financing thousands of scientific research projects that have changed our world.

The Research Corporation was founded in 1912 by Frederick Gardner Cottrell, scientist, inventor, environmentalist and philanthropist, with initial funding derived from the profits from his patents on the electrostatic precipitator. Research Corporation was the second foundation established in the United States (Andrew Carnegie established the Carnegie Foundation for the Advancement of Teaching in 1906) and America's first foundation devoted solely to the advancement of science. For over 100 years, RCSA has catalyzed transformative research by funding top early-career teacher-scholars at America's colleges and universities. 
 
RCSA seeks to identify and support ideas that could revolutionize and advance entire fields of study. At the same time, RCSA works to improve U.S. science education by advocating that faculty members enhance their teaching and contribution to society by remaining active in research and by involving undergraduates in their work. For many years the foundation has maintained that involving undergraduates in research develops critical thinking, creativity, problem solving, and intellectual independence, and promotes an innovation-oriented culture.

RCSA supports direct grants to academic scientists; conferences that leverage important scientific work that is already under way; advocacy with an emphasis on the research of early-career faculty; promulgating innovative ideas for scientific transformation; the integration of research and science teaching; interdisciplinary research; and building academic cultures that look toward tomorrow's scientific needs.
 
During the 1920s and 1930s, many scientists took out patents of their developments and assigned them to the Research Corporation in order to guarantee that any profits made from their work would be used for further scientific research (one notable example is Ernest O. Lawrence, who assigned his cyclotron patent to the company). The Research Corporation played a major role in the minds of many scientists of the period in formulating ideal policies about the role of intellectual property in science. It was one of the first foundations in the United States. In 1987, their invention-handing facilities became Research Corporation Technologies, a wholly independent company which handles technology transfer. It was also a major supporter of the research that led to the presentation of Interlingua in 1951.

Grants Programs: Cottrell Scholar Awards

The Cottrell Scholar Awards program (CSA) reinforces the growing awareness that teaching and research are complementary rather than wholly or partially exclusive. RCSA believes this convergence is essential for increasing the number of students who are attracted and retained in science.

Cottrell Scholar Awards are intended to: 
 Create a culture shift in Ph.D.-granting institutions toward valuing the university scholar;
 Increase the attraction and retention of undergraduates in science;
 Increase the number of undergraduates from Ph.D.-granting institutions pursuing graduate degrees.

The program provides $100,000 over three years to early-career faculty in chemistry, physics, astronomy, biochemistry and biophysics at major research universities. Cottrell Scholars are chosen not only for their high-quality research, but also for their dedication to the task of teaching undergraduates. There are currently more than 240 Scholars nationwide.

Each award recipient is required to attend at least two annual conferences during the three-year term of the award. These conferences are focused on providing opportunities to share teaching knowledge as well as mentoring from previous award recipients and nationally recognized experts on such topics as  navigating career paths, and balancing research and education in the research university environment. Numerous Cottrell Scholars have found the knowledge and recognition the program provides to be major motivating factors in their efforts to push through reforms in undergraduate science curricula at their universities.

In 2011 RCSA did not make any regular Cottrell Scholar Awards; instead, foundation personnel and various Cottrell Scholars focused on revamping and reorienting the program to increase its effectiveness in the coming decade. At the 2011 conference, a new synergistic organization, the Cottrell Scholar Collaborative, was launched. The Collaborative's central goal is to act collectively to change the way undergraduate science education is taught at major American universities.

Grants Programs: Cottrell College Science Awards

The Cottrell College Science Awards (CCSA) program, RCSA's oldest initiative, was created in the early 1970s to promote basic research as a vital component of undergraduate education at primarily undergraduate institutions (PUIs). CCSA has supported the research work of more than 1,300 PUI faculty in more than 400 institutions, and has generated research opportunities for thousands of undergraduates at both public and private institutions. One of RCSA's important goals is to motivate students to pursue careers in research and to become the advanced scientific workforce America will need to remain prosperous and safe in the challenging decades to come.

The awards are intended to: 
• Strengthen teacher-scholars while supporting high-quality research at primarily undergraduate institutions;
• Help early-career PUI faculty become competitive for federal funding;
• Encourage faculty to conduct meaningful collaborative work with undergraduate researchers, and;
• Enhance the research culture of science departments at public and private institutions in the U.S.

The CCSA Single-Investigator Award provides research support for early-career faculty with interests in the fields of chemistry, physics and astronomy and in closely related fields that overlap significantly with these three disciplines. RCSA also has a new initiative under the CCSA banner, the Multi-Investigator Awards, to encourage early-career faculty to establish in-house, interdisciplinary research collaborations. This was done to encourage PUI-based researchers to address the increasingly complex problems inherent in modern scientific inquiry.

Grants Programs: Arizona Partners in Science Awards

Arizona Partners in Science, an RCSA program in conjunction with the M.J. Murdock Charitable Trust, provides summer research opportunities for high-school science teachers under the supervision of faculty members at Arizona universities.

The objective of this program is to provide Arizona high-school science teachers the opportunity to work on summer research projects in collaboration with individual science faculty at universities within the state. The main goals are to help improve grade 9-12 science education and increase the number of students who choose to pursue science careers.

Strategic Partnerships

Research Corporation for Science Advancement works with corporations, fellow foundations, and government offices and agencies, as well as educational institutions, across the country.

RCSA's long-standing emphasis on funding for early career scientists provides vital support at an absolutely key stage for innovation. Its continued commitment to science in the classroom supports not only the top faculty and teachers who receive funding, but also their many students. RCSA's network of award winners, including 14 living Nobel Laureates, encourages a culture of mentoring to sustain and build professional connections leading to new scientific collaborations and discoveries.

In order to increase the breadth of its influence, in 2010 Research Corporation established a Strategic Partnerships program charged with increasing its endowment and establishing collaborations with corporations, fellow foundations, government offices and agencies.

Presidents

Robert N. Shelton, 2014–2017. Shelton became president of RCSA in March 2014. Previously he held top-level leadership positions in highly ranked public research universities and enjoyed a distinguished career as an experimental condensed-matter physicist focusing on novel materials and their properties. For five years, beginning in July 2006, he served as the 19th president of the University of Arizona, retiring to assume the position of executive director of the Arizona Sports Foundation before joining RCSA.  He left the Research Corporation to take up a position as the President of the Giant Magellan Telescope Organization.

James M. Gentile, 2005–2013. Gentile became president of Research Corporation in January 2005 after nearly 30 years at Hope College where he held an endowed chair in biology and served as Dean for the Natural Sciences. He has received numerous national and international awards over the years, including the Alexander Hollaender Research Excellence Award from the Environmental Mutagen Society and the Cancer Research Medallion from the National Cancer Institute of Japan. He is an AAAS Fellow. Originally from Chicago, Dr. Gentile earned his bachelor's degree from St. Mary's University of Minnesota and Master's and Doctoral degrees from Illinois State University. He spent two years in postdoctoral studies in the Department of Human Genetics at the Yale School of Medicine before accepting his position at Hope College.

Michael P. Doyle, 2002. Doyle is a chemist, educated at University of St. Thomas in St. Paul, Minnesota and Iowa State University in Ames. He did postdoctoral work at University of Illinois, Chicago. He taught at University of Arizona in Tucson, Nankai University in Tianjin, Japan; Hope College in Holland, Michigan, and Trinity University in San Antonio, Texas before joining RCSA as vice president in 1997. He has been Professor and Chair of the Department of Chemistry and Biochemistry at University of Maryland since 2003.

John P. Schaefer, 1982 -2004. Schaefer received his bachelor's degree in chemistry from the Polytechnic Institute in Brooklyn, New York; his Ph.D. in chemistry from the University of Illinois, Urbana; and was a postdoctoral fellow at California Institute of Technology. He began his career as an assistant professor of chemistry at the University of California, Berkeley, before moving to the University of Arizona in 1960. He served on the University of Arizona faculty for 21 years in numerous capacities: head of the Department of Chemistry; dean of the College of Liberal Arts; and as president of the university from 1971-1982. He became president of Research Corporation in 1982. Dr. Schaefer is also a skilled photographer and is one of the founders of the Center for Creative Photography at the University of Arizona.

James Stacy Coles, 1968-1982. Coles earned degrees from Mansfield State Teachers College and Columbia University. He taught chemistry at the College of the City University of New York and at Middlebury College, and was research supervisor at the Underwater Explosives Laboratory at Woods Hole Oceanographic Institution during World War II. After the war, he taught chemistry and served as acting dean at Brown University. In 1952 Coles became president of Bowdoin College. In 1967 he became president of Research Corporation. He retired in 1982, but remained chairman of the Foundation's executive committee until 1984.

J. William Hinkley, 1957-1967. Trained as an electrical engineer at Yale, Hinkley worked for Central Hudson Gas & Electric Corp. from 1927 to 1943. After spending a year on the staff of the Radiation Laboratory at Massachusetts Institute of Technology, he became manager of the Research Construction Company, a division of Research Corporation which produced and tested pilot models of radar equipment developed at the Radiation Laboratory. Hinkley became director of Research Corporation's newly formed Patent Management Division in 1946, and became president of the Foundation in 1957. Hinkley died August 1967 while still president of the Foundation.

Joseph Warren Barker, 1946-1957. Barker graduated from Massachusetts Institute of Technology in 1916. He became an officer in U.S. Army and served overseas before retiring in 1925 as a major. He became a professor of electrical engineering at MIT. At age 39, he became dean of the faculty of engineering at Columbia University. During World War II, when he was a special assistant to the secretary of the Navy, he received the Distinguished Civilian Service Award.

Howard Andrews Poillon, 1927-1945. Poillon studied for a year at Columbia University School of Mines, then prospected in Alaska for 10 years where he was a mucker in the gold mines. In 1910, he became manager of the Vanadium Mines in Cutter, New Mexico and later formed his own firm of consulting engineers for mining. In 1920, he became a director of Research Corporation; in 1927 he became president, a post he held until 1945.

Arthur A. Hamerschlag, 1922-1927. Hamerschlag worked in engineering for the U.S. government in Cuba and Mexico from 1888 to 1892. From 1903 until 1921, he was the first president of Carnegie Institute of Technology (now Carnegie Mellon University), and was one of the "select group" of Carnegie's friends who were bequeathed a lifetime annuity upon Carnegie's death. Hamerschlag became president of Research Corporation in 1922, a position he held until his death in 1927.

Elon Huntington Hooker, 1915-1922. From 1912 to 1915, Research Corporation was run by its board of directors. The first president, Hooker, was appointed in 1915. He received his undergraduate education at University of Rochester and his Ph.D. from Cornell University. He was a chemist, hydrodynamic engineer, and founder of Hooker Electrochemical Company, one of the first electrochemical plants in the U.S. at Niagara Falls, N.Y. Hooker was a friend and associate of Teddy Roosevelt and was among those called to Roosevelt's bedside while Roosevelt was dying in 1919.

Nobel Laureates
Research Corporation for Science Advancement has funded the early work of 40 scientists who have received Nobel Prizes.

 Harold C. Urey (1893-1981) won the Nobel Prize in chemistry in 1934. He received a Research Corporation grant in 1938 for research on isotopes.
 Ernest O. Lawrence (1901-1958) was awarded the Nobel Prize in physics in 1939. He received a Research Corporation grant in 1931 to secure magnet to build the first large cyclotron; renewed 1934, 1935, 1937, 1938. Award for nuclear physics 1939; renewed 1940, 1941, 1942.
 Isidor Isaac Rabi (1898-1988) received the Nobel Prize in physics in 1944. He received a Research Corporation grant in 1931 for molecular beam research, and an award in 1937 for research on magnetic moment of the atom; renewed 1938, 1939, 1940.
 Percy W. Bridgman (1882-1961) won the Nobel Prize in physics in 1946. He received a Research Corporation grant in 1954 for an investigation of the properties of matter under pressure with particular reference to the properties of alloys.
 Edward C. Kendall (1886-1972) received the Nobel Prize in physiology or medicine in 1950. He received a Research Corporation grant in 1942 for cortical hormones; it was renewed in 1943 and 1944.
 Felix Bloch (1905-1983) was awarded the Nobel Prize in physics in 1952. He received a Research Corporation grant in 1939 for low voltage generator, a grant in 1946 for nuclear induction and its application to polarized neutrons; renewed 1947, 1948.
 Edward M. Purcell (1912-1997) won the Nobel Prize in physics in 1952. He received Research Corporation grants in 1946 and 1948 for research on resonance absorption by nuclear magnetic moments.
 George Beadle (1903-1989). Nobel Prize in physiology or medicine 1958. He received a Research Corporation grant in 1944 for research on the induction and detection of biochemical mutations in Neurospora Crassa
 Edward L. Tatum (1909-1975) won the Nobel Prize in physiology or medicine in 1958. He received Research Corporation grants in 1946 and 1947 for research on the use of isotopes in the study of biosynthesis of amino acids. He received awards in 1971 and 1974 for characterization of enzymes of morphological mutants of neurospora.
 Severo Ochoa (1905-1993) was awarded the Nobel Prize in physiology or medicine in 1959. He received a Research Corporation grant in 1941 for research on the intermediary carbohydrate metabolism. Grant in 1944 for research on the respiratory enzymes and the mechanism of the biological oxidation of pyruvic acid. Another award in 1951 for the study of enzyme systems involved in biological oxidations and syntheses.
 Robert Hofstadter (1915-1990) received the Nobel Prize in physics in 1961. He received a Research Corporation grant in 1950 for study of nuclear electric charge distribution by experiments on the elastic scattering of electrons from nuclei.
 Feodor Lynen (1911-1979) won the Nobel Prize in physiology or medicine in 1964. He received a Research Corporation award in 1954 for research on the biosynthesis of the fatty acids and isoprene derivatives.
 Robert B. Woodward (1917-1979) was awarded the Nobel Prize in chemistry in 1965. He received a Research Corporation award in 1949 for experiments on the synthesis of cortisone; renewed 1950, 1951, 1952, 1953. New grant in 1957 for investigation of structure and synthesis of chlorophyll.
 Manfred Eigen (born 1927) received the Nobel Prize in chemistry in 1967. He received a Research Corporation award in 1954 for research concerning the velocity and mechanism of high speed ionic reactions.
 Robert W. Holley (1922-1993) won Nobel Prize in physiology or medicine in 1968. He received a Research Corporation grant in 1958 for research concerning the chemistry of intermediates in protein synthesis.
 Max Delbrück (1906-1981) received the Nobel Prize in physiology or medicine in 1969. He received a Research Corporation award in 1958 for study of the production, characterization and mapping of the phage T2L.
 Ernst Otto Fischer (1918-2007) was awarded the Nobel Prize in chemistry in 1973. He received a Research Corporation grant in 1961 to study the extension of metal microanalysis.
 William N. Lipscomb Jr. (1919-2011) won the Nobel Prize in chemistry in 1976. He received a Research Corporation grant in 1959 for determination of the molecular structure of an enzyme, a proteinase from Tetra-hymena pyriformis W, by x-ray diffraction methods.
 Herbert C. Brown (1912-2004) received the Nobel Prize in chemistry in 1979. He received  Research Corporation awards in 1948 and 1949 for research on the effects of structure on the chemistry of addition compounds.
 George Wald (1906-1997) was awarded the Nobel Prize in physiology or medicine in 1979. He received a Research Corporation grant in 1942 for research on the physiological action of thiamin in neuromuscular systems; renewed 1943. Grant in 1949 for (a) cozymase-destroying systems in the tissues of freshwater fishes, or (b) the conversion of β-carotene to vitamin A in vitro.
 Georg Wittig (1897-1987) won the Nobel Prize in chemistry in 1979. He received a Research Corporation award in 1955 for research on organic anion chemistry.
 Dudley Herschbach (born 1932) received the Nobel Prize in chemistry in 1986. He received a Research Corporation award in 1998 for research on a mechanical means to decelerate gaseous molecules.
 Donald J. Cram (1919-2001) was awarded the Nobel in chemistry in 1987. He received a Research Corporation grant in 1951 for research on macro-ring compounds containing aromatic nuclei as part of the ring system.
 Thomas R. Cech (born 1947) received the Nobel Prize for chemistry in 1989. He received Research Corporation grants in 1977 and 1978 for photochemical crosslinking of DNA with psoralens.
 Elias J. Corey (born 1928) won the Nobel Prize in chemistry in 1990. He received Research Corporation grants in 1958 and 1959 for the synthesis of electronically unstable organic structures protected by large substituents.
 Rudolph A. Marcus (born 1923) was awarded the Nobel Prize in chemistry in 1992. He received Research Corporation grants in 1954 and 1956 for studies of the behavior of the dicarboxylate ions.
 Edwin G. Krebs (1918-2009) received the Nobel Prize in physiology or medicine in 1992. He received Research Corporation grants in 1958 and 1959 for immunochemical studies on glycolytic enzymes.
 Joseph H. Taylor Jr. (born 1941) won the Nobel Prize in physics in 1993. He received a Research Corporation grant in 1970 for observations of the temporal variation of pulsars.
 Frederick Reines (1918-1998) was awarded the Nobel Prize in physics in 1995. He received a Research Corporation unrestricted venture grant in 1959 and a grant in 1961 to search for neurons and gamma-rays of extraterrestrial origin.
 Robert F. Curl Jr. (born 1933) received the Nobel Prize in chemistry in 1996. He received a Research Corporation grant in 1958 to for investigations of the microwave spectra of radicals and molecules.
 Richard E. Smalley (1943-2005) was awarded the Nobel Prize in chemistry in 1996. He received a Research Corporation grant in 1976 and 1977 to investigate supersonic molecular beam laser spectroscopy of photoactive molecules.
 Robert C. Richardson (1937–2013) won the Nobel Prize in physics in 1996. He received a Research Corporation grant in 1972 and 1973 for investigation of possible superfluid properties of liquid 3He.
 Ahmed H. Zewail (born 1946) received the Nobel Prize in chemistry in 1999. He received a Research Corporation grant in 1976 for an investigation of energy transport in high-dimensional solids.
 Alan G. MacDiarmid (1927-2007) was awarded the Nobel Prize in chemistry in 2000. He received a Research Corporation grant in 1956, 1957 and 1959 for an investigation of silico-ethyl (SiH3SiH2) compounds.
 Carl E. Wieman (born 1951) won the Nobel Prize in physics in 2001. He received a Research Corporation grant in 1981 for a precision test of the Weinberg-Salaam theory of weak and electromagnetic interactions.

References

External links
Research Corporation website

Science and technology in the United States
Research organizations in the United States
Organizations based in Tucson, Arizona
Organizations established in 1912